Kogalym (Khanty: Коголым, Kogolym) is a town in Khanty-Mansi Autonomous Okrug, Russia, located on the Inguyagun River  northeast of Khanty-Mansiysk. Population:

History
Kogalym was founded in 1975 due to the development of the oil fields in its vicinity. It was granted town status on 15 August 1985.

Administrative and municipal status
Within the framework of administrative divisions, it is, together with one rural locality, incorporated as the town of okrug significance of Kogalym—an administrative unit with the status equal to that of the districts. As a municipal division, the town of okrug significance of Kogalym is incorporated as Kogalym Urban Okrug.

Economy
Kogalym's economy is entirely dominated by the oil industry. The headquarters of the main extraction subsidiary of Lukoil (OOO LUKOIL-Zapadnaya Sibir) is located in Kogalym.

Transport
The town is served by the Kogalym International Airport and well as a railway station. The town is served by buses and several taxi companies. There is little congestion, except during peak hours, while small traffic jams occur.

Climate
Kogalym  has a subarctic climate (Köppen climate classification Dfc). Due to the northern location, the weather freezing in winter and cool in the summer. The  temperature in January is typically −30 to −40 C (a low of −62 C was recorded at the Vatyogan oil-field in 2006). The average wind speed is 3.1 metres per second, and the average humidity is 76.5%

References

Notes

Sources

Cities and towns in Khanty-Mansi Autonomous Okrug
Cities and towns built in the Soviet Union
Populated places established in 1975
Socialist planned cities